Bathochordaeus mcnutti is a species of larvacean in the family Oikopleuridae.

References 

Animals described in 2017
Appendicularia